Athanasius (born Antony Shumlianski; died 1694) was Brother of Iosyf Shumliansky and a former Orthodox bishop of Lutsk from 1686 to 1688. In 1688 he converted to the Catholic religion, and the union in the diocese declared his successor Dionysius (1702).

References
Encyclopedia of Ukrainian studies. In 10's t / Gl. yet. Kubiyovych Vladimir. – Paris, New York: Young Life, 1954–1989.

Converts to Eastern Catholicism from Eastern Orthodoxy
Former Ukrainian Orthodox Christians
Ukrainian Eastern Catholics
Eastern Orthodox bishops of Lutsk
17th-century births
17th-century deaths